Fraser James Quarterman (born 27 June 1983) is a New Zealand cricketer who played for Wellington and Essex's 2nd XI. Born in Wellington and educated at Massey University, Quarterman is a right–handed batsman and left–arm medium–fast bowler. He played his debut match for Wellington against Canterbury on 1 December 2007, scoring three runs and taking a wicket in each innings.

References

External links
 

New Zealand cricketers
Massey University alumni
1983 births
Wellington cricketers
Living people